Witchfinder General is a 1966 novel written by Ronald Bassett. It tells the heavily fictionalized story of Matthew Hopkins, a notorious 17th-century witch-hunter.

According to historian Malcolm Gaskill, in Bassett's novel Hopkins is a 50-ish Ipswich lawyer "who becomes a pikeman in a parliamentarian regiment to escape his creditors, and from there reinvents himself as 'a black-winged Attila, leaving behind him a trail of gibbet-hung corpses'."  Promoted as a horror novel, the back cover blurb of the book warned that the contents were "Not for those with delicate stomachs."   The book served as the basis for Michael Reeves's violent and controversial 1968 film of the same name, also known as The Conqueror Worm.

References

1966 British novels
British historical novels
British horror novels
British novels adapted into films
Novels set during the English Civil War
Novels set in the 17th century
Witch hunting in fiction
Barrie & Jenkins books